The Craiova II Power Station is a large thermal power plant located in Craiova, Romania, having 2 generation groups of 150 MW each having a total electricity generation capacity of 300 MW.

There are plans to add another generating group of 150 MW at Craiova II Power Station that will result a total power generating capacity of 450 MWh at a cost of US$225 million.

References

External links
Description 

Natural gas-fired power stations in Romania